Willi Fels  (17 April 1858 – 29 June 1946) was a New Zealand merchant, collector and philanthropist.

Biography
Fels was born in Halle an der Weser, Germany on 17 April 1858. Fels had a keen interest in history and classics, but rather than going to university he became manager of the family's woollen mill near Paderborn.

Fels was visited by his uncle, Bendix Hallenstein, in 1881, and married Sara, one of Hallenstein's daughters in the same year. Willi and Sara had three daughters Helene, Emily and Kate; and one son Harold who was killed in World War I.

Hallenstein had become prominent in the New Zealand city of Dunedin as a merchant in the years immediately following the 1862 Central Otago Gold Rush, and in 1888 the Fels moved to Dunedin to join Hallenstein's family business, Hallenstein Brothers. Fels eventually became managing director of this firm and the connected Drapery and General Importing Company.

Fels was an avid collector, and his journeys through the young colony on business afforded him the opportunity to collect Māori and Polynesian art and artefacts. He also collected ethnological art and artefacts from southern and eastern Asia (such as Ukiyo-e), and many classical artifacts and historical literature. He established the first fund for the purchasing ethnological collections at the Otago Museum who subsequently names the Fels Wing of the museum in his honour. 

After the death of Fels' only son Harold (1891-1917) who was killed in action in France in World War I, Fels decided to bequeath his collection to the Otago Museum, and also began a fund which greatly increased the museum's collections. In 1930, a new wing, the Fels Wing, was added to the museum. Total additions to the museum's collection by Fels, either during his lifetime or through his will, totalled over 70,000 pieces and funds of some £25,000. Many of his most valuable books were also donated to the University of Otago's library. These included many first editions, illuminated manuscripts, and other rare works. The university also benefitted from Fels' endowment of a lectureship in ethnology during the 1920s.

In 1935, Fels was awarded the King George V Silver Jubilee Medal. He was appointed a Companion of the Order of St Michael and St George, for services to ethnology in New Zealand, in the 1936 New Year Honours. He died at his residence in Dunedin in 1946 and his ashes were interred at the Southern Cemetery in a plot with Bendix Hallenstein.

Fels' family were prominent in the arts and culture of southern New Zealand for many years, his cousins, the De Beers (including Esmond Samuel de Beer), and grandson Charles Brasch also making a permanent mark on the country's cultural life.

References

1858 births
1946 deaths
New Zealand philanthropists
German emigrants to New Zealand
19th-century German Jews
New Zealand art collectors
Businesspeople from Dunedin
New Zealand Companions of the Order of St Michael and St George
Burials at Dunedin Southern Cemetery
Hallenstein family
People associated with Otago Museum